Anders Karlsson (born 1951), is a Swedish social democratic politician, member of the Riksdag since 1998.

References

Members of the Riksdag from the Social Democrats
Living people
1951 births
Members of the Riksdag 2002–2006